Graeme Johns is a former professional rugby league footballer who played in the 1970s and 1980s. He played at representative level for Wales, and at club level for Swinton, Salford and Blackpool Borough.

Career

Club career
In March 1981, Johns was signed by Whitehaven for a fee of £3,500.

International honours
Graeme Johns won caps for Wales while at Salford in 1979 against France (interchange/substitute), and while at Blackpool Borough in 1984 against England (interchange/substitute).

References

Living people
Blackpool Borough players
Place of birth missing (living people)
Salford Red Devils players
Swinton Lions players
Wales national rugby league team players
Whitehaven R.L.F.C. players
Year of birth missing (living people)